Bodimettu  is a locality in Theni district in the state of Tamil Nadu in India, near the border with Kerala. It is 10 km from Poopara on the way to Bodinayakkanur by the side of National Highway 85, which runs from Dhanushkodi to Kochi. Bodimettu is the main cardamom-growing area of Tamil Nadu. It is close to famous tourist destinations such as Munnar, Marayur, Thekkady, Kodaikanal, Anayirangal Dam.

Demographics
 India census, Bodimettu hill had a population of 733. Males constitute 390 of the population and females 343. Bodimettu hill has an average literacy rate of 71%, higher than the national average of 59.5%: male literacy is 40%, and female literacy is 30%. In bodimettu, 57 of the population is under 6 years of age.

Tourist Place: 
it is just 30 minutes from Bodinayakkanur, and the perfect place for picnic and spend a nice time with mountain views and chill weather of hill station, lot of developments are going to promote this place for tourist who come to visit Munnar, Chinnakanal and near by hill & tea gardens. new Hotels and Home stays have come up in last few years..

References
  Bodi Mettu Photography In Theni Pasanga Daa page go album Bodi Mettu Click and Enjoy

Villages in Theni district